Robot-assisted surgery or robotic surgery are any types of surgical procedures that are performed using robotic systems. Robotically assisted surgery was developed to try to overcome the limitations of pre-existing minimally-invasive surgical procedures and to enhance the capabilities of surgeons performing open surgery.

In the case of robotically assisted minimally-invasive surgery, instead of the surgeon directly moving the instruments, the surgeon uses one of two methods to perform dissection, hemostasis and resection, using a direct telemanipulator, or through computer control.
 A telemanipulator (e.g. the da Vinci Surgical System) is a system of remotely controlled manipulators that allows the surgeon to operate real-time under stereoscopic vision from a control console separate from the operating table. The robot is docked next to the patient, and robotic arms carry out endoscopy-like maneuvers via end-effectors inserted through specially designed trocars. A surgical assistant and a scrub nurse are often still needed scrubbed at the tableside to help switch effector instruments or provide additional suction or temporary tissue retraction using endoscopic grasping instruments.
 In computer-controlled systems, the surgeon uses a computer system to relay control data and direct the robotic arms and its end-effectors, though these systems can also still use telemanipulators for their input. One advantage of using the computerized method is that the surgeon does not have to be present on campus to perform the procedure, leading to the possibility for remote surgery and even AI-assisted or automated procedures.

Memory devices play an essential role in preventing any inconveniences in the robot-assisted surgery. The memory storage solutions can perform multiple functions based on the patient's physical record. They can also indicate specific information to measure calibration offsets indicating misalignment of the storage drive system, life of the data, and so on.

Robotic surgery has been criticized for its expense, with the average costs in 2007 ranging from $5,607 to $45,914 per patient. This technique has not been approved for cancer surgery as of 2019 as the safety and usefulness is unclear.

History
The concept of using standard hand grips to control manipulators and cameras of various sizes down to sub-miniature was described in the Robert Heinlein story 'Waldo', which also mentioned brain surgery.
The first robot to assist in surgery was the Arthrobot, which was developed and used for the first time in Vancouver in 1985. This robot assisted in being able to manipulate and position the patient's leg on voice command. Intimately involved were biomedical engineer James McEwen, Geof Auchinleck, a UBC engineering physics grad, and Dr. Brian Day as well as a team of engineering students. The robot was used in an orthopaedic surgical procedure on 12 March 1984, at the UBC Hospital in Vancouver. Over 60 arthroscopic surgical procedures were performed in the first 12 months, and a 1985 National Geographic video on industrial robots, The Robotics Revolution, featured the device. Other related robotic devices developed at the same time included a surgical scrub nurse robot, which handed operative instruments on voice command, and a medical laboratory robotic arm. A YouTube video entitled Arthrobot – the world's first surgical robot illustrates some of these in operation.

In 1985 a robot, the Unimation Puma 200, was used to orient a needle for a brain biopsy while under CT guidance during a neurological procedure. In the late 1980s, Imperial College in London developed PROBOT, which was then used to perform prostatic surgery. The advantages to this robot was its small size, accuracy and lack of fatigue for the surgeon. In 1992, the ROBODOC was introduced and revolutionized orthopedic surgery by being able to assist with hip replacement surgeries. The latter was the first surgical robot that was approved by the FDA in 2008. The ROBODOC from Integrated Surgical Systems (working closely with IBM) could mill out precise fittings in the femur for hip replacement. The purpose of the ROBODOC was to replace the previous method of carving out a femur for an implant, the use of a mallet and broach/rasp.

Further development of robotic systems was carried out by SRI International and Intuitive Surgical with the introduction of the da Vinci Surgical System and Computer Motion with the AESOP and the ZEUS robotic surgical system. The first robotic surgery took place at The Ohio State University Medical Center in Columbus, Ohio under the direction of Robert E. Michler.

AESOP was a breakthrough in robotic surgery when introduced in 1994, as it was the first laparoscopic camera holder to be approved by the FDA. NASA initially funded the company that produces AESOP, Computer Motion, due to its goal to create a robotic arm that can be used in space, but this project ended up becoming a camera used in laparoscopic procedures. Voice control was then added in 1996 with the AESOP 2000 and seven degrees of freedom to mimic a human hand was added in 1998 with the AESOP 3000.

ZEUS was introduced commercially in 1998, and was started the idea of telerobotics or telepresence surgery where the surgeon is at a distance from the robot on a console and operates on the patient. Examples of using ZEUS include a fallopian tube reconnection in July 1998, a beating heart coronary artery bypass graft in October 1999, and the Lindbergh Operation, which was a cholecystectomy performed remotely in September 2001.  In 2003, ZEUS made its most prominent mark in cardiac surgery after successfully harvesting the left internal mammary arteries in 19 patients, all of which had very successful clinical outcomes.

The original telesurgery robotic system that the da Vinci was based on was developed at Stanford Research Institute International in Menlo Park with grant support from DARPA and NASA. A demonstration of an open bowel anastomosis was given to the Association of Military Surgeons of the US. Although the telesurgical robot was originally intended to facilitate remotely performed surgery in the battlefield and other remote environments, it turned out to be more useful for minimally invasive on-site surgery. The patents for the early prototype were sold to Intuitive Surgical in Mountain View, California. The da Vinci senses the surgeon's hand movements and translates them electronically into scaled-down micro-movements to manipulate the tiny proprietary instruments. It also detects and filters out any tremors in the surgeon's hand movements, so that they are not duplicated robotically. The camera used in the system provides a true stereoscopic picture transmitted to a surgeon's console. Compared to the ZEUS, the da Vinci robot is attached to trocars to the surgical table, and can imitate the human wrist. In 2000, the da Vinci obtained FDA approval for general laparoscopic procedures and became the first operative surgical robot in the US. Examples of using the da Vinci system include the first robotically assisted heart bypass (performed in Germany) in May 1998, and the first performed in the United States in September 1999; and the first all-robotic-assisted kidney transplant, performed in January 2009. The da Vinci Si was released in April 2009 and initially sold for $1.75 million.

In 2005, a surgical technique was documented in canine and cadaveric models called the transoral robotic surgery (TORS) for the da Vinci robot surgical system as it was the only FDA-approved robot to perform head and neck surgery. In 2006, three patients underwent resection of the tongue using this technique. The results were more clear visualization of the cranial nerves, lingual nerves, and lingual artery, and the patients had a faster recovery to normally swallowing. In May 2006 the first artificial intelligence doctor-conducted unassisted robotic surgery was on a 34-year-old male to correct heart arrhythmia. The results were rated as better than an above-average human surgeon. The machine had a database of 10,000 similar operations, and so, in the words of its designers, was "more than qualified to operate on any patient". In August 2007, Dr. Sijo Parekattil of the Robotics Institute and Center for Urology (Winter Haven Hospital and University of Florida) performed the first robotic-assisted microsurgery procedure denervation of the spermatic cord for chronic testicular pain. In February 2008, Dr. Mohan S. Gundeti of the University of Chicago Comer Children's Hospital performed the first robotic pediatric neurogenic bladder reconstruction.

On 12 May 2008, the first image-guided MR-compatible robotic neurosurgical procedure was performed at University of Calgary by Dr. Garnette Sutherland using the NeuroArm. In June 2008, the German Aerospace Centre (DLR) presented a robotic system for minimally invasive surgery, the MiroSurge. In September 2010, the Eindhoven University of Technology announced the development of the Sofie surgical system, the first surgical robot to employ force feedback. In September 2010, the first robotic operation at the femoral vasculature was performed at the University Medical Centre Ljubljana by a team led by Borut Geršak.

Uses

Ophthalmology 
Ophthalmology is still part of the frontier for robotic-assisted surgeries. However, there are a couple of robotic systems that are capable of successfully performing surgeries.
 PRECEYES Surgical System is being used for vitreoretinal surgeries. This is a single arm robot, that is tele manipulated by a surgeon. This system attaches to the head of the operating room table and provides surgeons with increased precision with the help of the intuitive motion controller. Preceyes is the only robotic instrument to be CE certified. Some other companies like Forsight Robotics, Acusurgical  that raised 5.75 M€ (France), and Horizon (US) are working in this field.
 The da Vinci Surgical System, though not specifically designed for ophthalmic procedures, uses telemanipulation to perform pterygium repairs and ex-vivo corneal surgeries.

Heart
Some examples of heart surgery being assisted by robotic surgery systems include:
 Atrial septal defect repair – the repair of a hole between the two upper chambers of the heart,
 Mitral valve repair – the repair of the valve that prevents blood from regurgitating back into the upper heart chambers during contractions of the heart,
 Coronary artery bypass – rerouting of blood supply by bypassing blocked arteries that provide blood to the heart.

Thoracic
Robotic surgery has become more widespread in thoracic surgery for mediastinal pathologies, pulmonary pathologies and more recently complex esophageal surgery.

The da Vinci Xi system is used for lung and mediastinal mass resection. This minimally invasive approach as a comparable alternative to video-assisted thoracoscopic surgery (VATS) and the standard open thoracic surgery. Although VATS is the less expensive option, the robotic-assisted approach offers benefits such as 3D visualizations with seven degrees of freedom and improved dexterity while having equivalent perioperative outcomes.

ENT 
The first successful robot-assisted cochlear implantation in a person took place in Bern, Switzerland in 2017. Surgical robots have been developed for use at various stages of cochlear implantation, including drilling through the mastoid bone, accessing the inner ear and inserting the electrode into the cochlea.

Advantages of robot-assisted cochlear implantation include improved accuracy, resulting in fewer mistakes during electrode insertion and better hearing outcomes for patients. The surgeon uses image-guided surgical planning to program the robot based on the patient's individual anatomy. This helps the implant team to predict where the contacts of the electrode array will be located within the cochlea, which can assist with audio processor fitting post-surgery. The surgical robots also allow surgeons to reach the inner ear in a minimally invasive way.

Challenges that still need to be addressed include safety, time, efficiency and cost.

Surgical robots have also been shown to be useful for electrode insertion with pediatric patients.

Gastrointestinal
Multiple types of procedures have been performed with either the 'Zeus' or da Vinci robot systems, including bariatric surgery and gastrectomy for cancer. Surgeons at various universities initially published case series demonstrating different techniques and the feasibility of GI surgery using the robotic devices. Specific procedures have been more fully evaluated, specifically esophageal fundoplication for the treatment of gastroesophageal reflux and Heller myotomy for the treatment of achalasia.

Robot-assisted pancreatectomies have been found to be associated with "longer operating time, lower estimated blood loss, a higher spleen-preservation rate, and shorter hospital stay[s]" than laparoscopic pancreatectomies; there was "no significant difference in transfusion, conversion to open surgery, overall complications, severe complications, pancreatic fistula, severe pancreatic fistula, ICU stay, total cost, and 30-day mortality between the two groups."

Gynecology
The first report of robotic surgery in gynecology was published in 1999 from the Cleveland Clinic. The adoption of robotic surgery has contributed to the increase in minimally invasive surgery for gynecologic disease. Gynecologic procedures may take longer with robot-assisted surgery and the rate of complications may be higher, but there are not enough high-quality studies to know at the present time. In the United States, robotic-assisted hysterectomy for benign conditions was shown to be more expensive than conventional laparoscopic hysterectomy in 2015, with no difference in overall rates of complications.

This includes the use of the da Vinci surgical system in benign gynecology and gynecologic oncology. Robotic surgery can be used to treat fibroids, abnormal periods, endometriosis, ovarian tumors, uterine prolapse, and female cancers. Using the robotic system, gynecologists can perform hysterectomies, myomectomies, and lymph node biopsies. The Hominis robotic system developed by Momentis Surgical™ is aimed to provide a robotic platform for natural orifice transluminal endoscopic surgery (Notes) for myomectomy through the vagina.

A 2017 review of surgical removal of the uterus and cervix for early cervical cancer robotic and laparoscopic surgery resulted in similar outcomes with respect to the cancer.

Bone
Robots are used in orthopedic surgery.

ROBODOC is the first active robotic system that performs some of the surgical actions in a total hip arthroplasty (THA). It is programmed preoperatively using data from computer tomography (CT) scans. This allows for the surgeon to choose the optimal size and design for the replacement hip.

Acrobot and Rio are semi-active robotic systems that are used in THA. It consists of a drill bit that is controlled by the surgeon however the robotic system does not allow any movement outside the predetermined boundaries.

Mazor X is used in spinal surgeries to assist surgeons with placing pedicle screw instrumentation. Inaccuracy when placing a pedicle screw can result in neurovascular injury or construct failure. Mazor X functions by using templating imaging to locate itself to the target location of where the pedicle screw is needed.

Spine
Robotic devices started to be used in minimally invasive spine surgery starting in the mid-2000s.  As of 2014, there were too few randomized clinical trials to judge whether robotic spine surgery is more or less safe than other approaches.

As of 2019, the application of robotics in spine surgery has mainly been limited to pedicle screw insertion for spinal fixation. In addition, the majority of studies on robot-assisted spine surgery have investigated lumbar or lumbosacral vertebrae only. Studies on use of robotics for placing screws in the cervical and thoracic vertebrae are limited.

Transplant surgery
The first fully robotic kidney transplantations were performed in the late 2000s. It may allow kidney transplantations in people who are obese who could not otherwise have the procedure. Weight loss however is the preferred initial effort.

General surgery 
With regards to robotic surgery, this type of procedure is currently best suited for single-quadrant procedures, in which the operations can be performed on any one of the four quadrants of the abdomen. Cost disadvantages are applied with procedures such as a cholecystectomy and fundoplication, but are suitable opportunities for surgeons to advance their robotic surgery skills.

Urology
Robotic surgery in the field of urology has become common, especially in the United States.

There is inconsistent evidence of benefits compared to standard surgery to justify the increased costs. Some have found tentative evidence of more complete removal of cancer and fewer side effects from surgery for prostatectomy.

In 2000, the first robot-assisted laparoscopic radical prostatectomy was performed.

Robotic surgery has also been utilized in radical cystectomies. A 2013 review found less complications and better short term outcomes when compared to open technique.

Pediatrics 
Pediatric procedures are also benefiting from robotic surgical systems. The smaller abdominal size in pediatric patients limits the viewing field in most urology procedures. The robotic surgical systems help surgeons overcome these limitations. Robotic technology provides assistance in performing
 Pyeloplasty - alternative to the conventional open dismembered pyeloplasty (Anderson-Hynes). Pyeloplasty is the most common robotic-assisted procedures in children.
 Ureteral reimplantation - alternative to the open intravesical or extravesical surgery.
 Ureteroureterostomy - alternative to the transperitoneal approach.
 Nephrectomy and heminephrectomy - Traditionally done with laparoscopy, it is not likely that a robotic procedure offers significant advantage due to its high cost.

Comparison to traditional methods
Major advances aided by surgical robots have been remote surgery, minimally invasive surgery and unmanned surgery. Due to robotic use, the surgery is done with precision, miniaturization, smaller incisions; decreased blood loss, less pain, and quicker healing time. Articulation beyond normal manipulation and three-dimensional magnification help to result in improved ergonomics. Due to these techniques, there is a reduced duration of hospital stays, blood loss, transfusions, and use of pain medication.
The existing open surgery technique has many flaws such as limited access to the surgical area, long recovery time, long hours of operation, blood loss, surgical scars, and marks.

The robot's costs range from $1 million to $2.5 million for each unit, and while its disposable supply cost is normally $1,500 per procedure, the cost of the procedure is higher. Additional surgical training is needed to operate the system. Numerous feasibility studies have been done to determine whether the purchase of such systems are worthwhile. As it stands, opinions differ dramatically. Surgeons report that, although the manufacturers of such systems provide training on this new technology, the learning phase is intensive and surgeons must perform 150 to 250 procedures to become adept in their use. During the training phase, minimally invasive operations can take up to twice as long as traditional surgery, leading to operating room tie-ups and surgical staffs keeping patients under anesthesia for longer periods. Patient surveys indicate they chose the procedure based on expectations of decreased morbidity, improved outcomes, reduced blood loss and less pain. Higher expectations may explain higher rates of dissatisfaction and regret.

Compared with other minimally invasive surgery approaches, robot-assisted surgery gives the surgeon better control over the surgical instruments and a better view of the surgical site. In addition, surgeons no longer have to stand throughout the surgery and do not get tired as quickly. Naturally occurring hand tremors are filtered out by the robot's computer software. Finally, the surgical robot can continuously be used by rotating surgery teams. Laparoscopic camera positioning is also significantly steadier with less inadvertent movements under robotic controls than compared to human assistance.

There are some issues in regards to current robotic surgery usage in clinical applications. There is a lack of haptics in some robotic systems currently in clinical use, which means there is no force feedback, or touch feedback. No interaction between the instrument and the patient is felt. However, recently the Senhance robotic system by Asensus Surgical was developed with haptic feedback in order to improve the interaction between the surgeon and the tissue.

The robots can also be very large, have instrumentation limitations, and there may be issues with multi-quadrant surgery as current devices are solely used for single-quadrant application.

Critics of the system, including the American Congress of Obstetricians and Gynecologists, say there is a steep learning curve for surgeons who adopt the use of the system and that there's a lack of studies that indicate long-term results are superior to results following traditional laparoscopic surgery. Articles in the newly created Journal of Robotic Surgery tend to report on one surgeon's experience.

Complications related to robotic surgeries range from converting the surgery to open, re-operation, permanent injury, damage to viscera and nerve damage. From 2000 to 2011, out of 75 hysterectomies done with robotic surgery, 34 had permanent injury, and 49 had damage to the viscera.  Prostatectomies were more prone to permanent injury, nerve damage and visceral damage as well. Very minimal surgeries in a variety of specialties had to actually be converted to open or be re-operated on, but most did sustain some kind of damage or injury. For example, out of seven coronary artery bypass grafting, one patient had to go under re-operation. It is important that complications are captured, reported and evaluated to ensure the medical community is better educated on the safety of this new technology.  If something was to go wrong in a robot-assisted surgery, it is difficult to identify culpability, and the safety of the practice will influence how quickly and widespread these practices are used.

One drawback of the use of robotic surgery is the risk of mechanical failure of the system and instruments. A study from July 2005 to December 2008 was conducted to analyze the mechanical failures of the da Vinci Surgical System at a single institute. During this period, a total of 1797 robotic surgeries were performed used 4 da Vinci surgical systems. There were 43 cases (2.4%) of mechanical failure, including 24 (1.3%) cases of mechanical failure or malfunction and 19 (1.1%) cases of instrument malfunction. Additionally, one open and two laparoscopic conversions (0.17%) were performed. Therefore, the chance of mechanical failure or malfunction was found to be rare, with the rate of converting to an open or laparoscopic procedure very low.

There are also current methods of robotic surgery being marketed and advertised online. Removal of a cancerous prostate has been a popular treatment through internet marketing. Internet marketing of medical devices are more loosely regulated than pharmaceutical promotions. Many sites that claim the benefits of this type of procedure had failed to mention risks and also provided unsupported evidence. There is an issue with government and medical societies promotion a production of balanced educational material. In the US alone, many websites promotion robotic surgery fail to mention any risks associated with these types of procedures, and hospitals providing materials largely ignore risks, overestimate benefits and are strongly influenced by the manufacturer.

See also

References

External links 

Computer-assisted surgery
 
Telemedicine
Health informatics